Ville Syväjärvi (born June 23, 1983) is a Finnish footballer playing for Rovaniemen Palloseura (RoPS) in Rovaniemi.

References
 Guardian Football

1983 births
Living people
Finnish footballers
Rovaniemen Palloseura players
Veikkausliiga players
Association football defenders
People from Rovaniemi
Sportspeople from Lapland (Finland)
FC Santa Claus players